Åbo Nation (ÅN) is one of the 15 student nations at the University of Helsinki, it is Swedish-speaking and was established in 1906.

References

External links

Student nations in Greater Helsinki